In physical cosmology, baryogenesis (also known as baryosynthesis) is the physical process that is hypothesized to have taken place during the early universe to produce baryonic asymmetry, i.e. the imbalance of matter (baryons) and antimatter (antibaryons) in the observed universe.

One of the outstanding problems in modern physics is the predominance of matter over antimatter in the universe. The universe, as a whole, seems to have a nonzero positive baryon number density. Since it is assumed in cosmology that the particles we see were created using the same physics we measure today, it would normally be expected that the overall baryon number should be zero, as matter and antimatter should have been created in equal amounts. A number of theoretical mechanisms are proposed to account for this discrepancy, namely identifying conditions that favour symmetry breaking and the creation of normal matter (as opposed to antimatter). This imbalance has to be exceptionally small, on the order of 1 in every  (≈) particles a small fraction of a second after the Big Bang. After most of the matter and antimatter was annihilated, what remained was all the baryonic matter in the current universe, along with a much greater number of bosons. Experiments reported in 2010 at Fermilab, however, seem to show that this imbalance is much greater than previously assumed. These experiments involved a series of particle collisions and found that the amount of generated matter was approximately 1% larger than the amount of generated antimatter. The reason for this discrepancy is not yet known.

Most grand unified theories explicitly break the baryon number symmetry, which would account for this discrepancy, typically invoking reactions mediated by very massive X bosons  or massive Higgs bosons. The rate at which these events occur is governed largely by the mass of the intermediate  or  particles, so by assuming these reactions are responsible for the majority of the baryon number seen today, a maximum mass can be calculated above which the rate would be too slow to explain the presence of matter today. These estimates predict that a large volume of material will occasionally exhibit a spontaneous proton decay, which has not been observed. Therefore, the imbalance between matter and antimatter remains a mystery.

Baryogenesis theories are based on different descriptions of the interaction between fundamental particles. Two main theories are electroweak baryogenesis (standard model), which would occur during the electroweak epoch, and the GUT baryogenesis, which would occur during or shortly after the grand unification epoch. Quantum field theory and statistical physics are used to describe such possible mechanisms.

Baryogenesis is followed by primordial nucleosynthesis, when atomic nuclei began to form.

Background 
The majority of ordinary matter in the universe is found in atomic nuclei, which are made of neutrons and protons. These nucleons are made up of smaller particles called quarks, and antimatter equivalents for each are predicted to exist by the Dirac equation in 1928. Since then, each kind of antiquark has been experimentally verified. Hypotheses investigating the first few instants of the universe predict a composition with an almost equal number of quarks and antiquarks. Free and separate individual quarks and antiquarks have never been observed in experiments—quarks and antiquarks are always found in groups of three (baryons), or bound in quark–antiquark pairs (mesons). Likewise, there is no experimental evidence that there are any significant concentrations of antimatter in the observable universe.

There are two main interpretations for this disparity: either the universe began with a small preference for matter (total baryonic number of the universe different from zero), or the universe was originally perfectly symmetric, but somehow a set of phenomena contributed to a small imbalance in favour of matter over time. The second point of view is preferred, although there is no clear experimental evidence indicating either of them to be the correct one.

GUT Baryogenesis under Sakharov conditions 

In 1967, Andrei Sakharov proposed a set of three necessary conditions that a baryon-generating interaction must satisfy to produce matter and antimatter at different rates. These conditions were inspired by the recent discoveries of the cosmic background radiation and CP-violation in the neutral kaon system. The three necessary "Sakharov conditions" are:
 Baryon number  violation.
 C-symmetry and CP-symmetry violation.
 Interactions out of thermal equilibrium.

Baryon number violation is a necessary condition to produce an excess of baryons over anti-baryons. But C-symmetry violation is also needed so that the interactions which produce more baryons than anti-baryons will not be counterbalanced by interactions which produce more anti-baryons than baryons. CP-symmetry violation is similarly required because otherwise equal numbers of left-handed  baryons and right-handed anti-baryons would be produced, as well as equal numbers of left-handed anti-baryons and right-handed baryons. Finally, the interactions must be out of thermal equilibrium, since otherwise CPT symmetry would assure compensation between processes increasing and decreasing the baryon number.

Currently, there is no experimental evidence of particle interactions where the conservation of baryon number is broken perturbatively: this would appear to suggest that all observed particle reactions have equal baryon number before and after. Mathematically, the commutator of the baryon number quantum operator with the (perturbative) Standard Model hamiltonian is zero: . However, the Standard Model is known to violate the conservation of baryon number only non-perturbatively: a global U(1) anomaly. To account for baryon violation in baryogenesis, such events (including proton decay) can occur in Grand Unification Theories (GUTs) and supersymmetric (SUSY) models via hypothetical massive bosons such as the X boson.

The second condition – violation of CP-symmetry – was discovered in 1964 (direct CP-violation, that is violation of CP-symmetry in a decay process, was discovered later, in 1999). Due to CPT symmetry, violation of CP-symmetry demands violation of time inversion symmetry, or T-symmetry.

In the out-of-equilibrium decay scenario, the last condition states that the rate of a reaction which generates baryon-asymmetry must be less than the rate of expansion of the universe. In this situation the particles and their corresponding antiparticles do not achieve thermal equilibrium due to rapid expansion decreasing the occurrence of pair-annihilation.

Baryogenesis within the Standard Model 

The Standard Model can incorporate baryogenesis, though the amount of net baryons (and leptons) thus created may not be sufficient to account for the present baryon asymmetry. There is a required one excess quark per billion quark-antiquark pairs in the early universe in order to provide all the observed matter in the universe. This insufficiency has not yet been explained, theoretically or otherwise.

Baryogenesis within the Standard Model requires the electroweak symmetry breaking to be a first-order phase transition, since otherwise sphalerons wipe off any baryon asymmetry that happened up to the phase transition. Beyond this, the remaining amount of baryon non-conserving interactions is negligible.

The phase transition domain wall breaks the P-symmetry spontaneously, allowing for CP-symmetry violating interactions to break C-symmetry on both its sides. Quarks tend to accumulate on the broken phase side of the domain wall, while anti-quarks tend to accumulate on its unbroken phase side. Due to CP-symmetry violating electroweak interactions, some amplitudes involving quarks are not equal to the corresponding amplitudes involving anti-quarks, but rather have opposite phase (see CKM matrix and Kaon); since time reversal takes an amplitude to its complex conjugate, CPT-symmetry is conserved in this entire process.

Though some of their amplitudes have opposite phases, both quarks and anti-quarks have positive energy, and hence acquire the same phase as they move in space-time. This phase also depends on their mass, which is identical but depends both on flavor and on the Higgs VEV which changes along the domain wall. Thus certain sums of amplitudes for quarks have different absolute values compared to those of anti-quarks. In all, quarks and anti-quarks may have different reflection and transmission probabilities through the domain wall, and it turns out that more quarks coming from the unbroken phase are transmitted compared to anti-quarks.

Thus there is a net baryonic flux through the domain wall. Due to sphaleron transitions, which are abundant in the unbroken phase, the net anti-baryonic content of the unbroken phase is wiped off as anti-baryons are transformed into leptons. However, sphalerons are rare enough in the broken phase as not to wipe off the excess of baryons there. In total, there is net creation of baryons (as well as leptons).

In this scenario, non-perturbative electroweak interactions (i.e. the sphaleron) are responsible for the B-violation, the perturbative electroweak Lagrangian is responsible for the CP-violation, and the domain wall is responsible for the lack of thermal equilibrium and the P-violation; together with the CP-violation it also creates a C-violation in each of its sides.

Matter content in the universe 
The central question to Baryogenesis is what causes the preference for matter over antimatter in the universe, as well as the magnitude of this asymmetry. An important quantifier is the asymmetry parameter, given by

According to the Big Bang model, matter decoupled from the cosmic background radiation (CBR) at a temperature of roughly  kelvin, corresponding to an average kinetic energy of  / = . After the decoupling, the total number of CBR photons remains constant. Therefore, due to space-time expansion, the photon density decreases.
,

Therefore, the asymmetry parameter , as defined above, is not the "best" parameter. Instead, the preferred asymmetry parameter uses the entropy density ,

because the entropy density of the universe remained reasonably constant throughout most of its evolution. The entropy density is

,
At the present epoch,

Ongoing research efforts

Ties to dark matter 
A possible explanation for the cause of baryogenesis is the decay reaction of B-Mesogenesis. This phenomenon suggests that in the early universe, particles such as the B-meson decay into a visible Standard Model baryon as well as a dark antibaryon that is invisible to current observation techniques. The process begins by assuming a massive, long-lived, scalar particle  that exists in the early universe before Big Bang nucleosynthesis. These b quarks form into B-mesons, which immediately hadronize into oscillating CP-violating  states, thus satisfying another Sakharov condition. If this process occurs fast enough, the CP-violation effect gets carried over to the dark matter sector. However, this contradicts (or at least challenges) the last Sakharov condition, since the expected matter preference in the visible universe is balanced by a new antimatter preference in the dark matter of the universe and total baryon number is conserved.

B-Mesogenesis results in missing energy between the initial and final states of the decay process, which, if recorded, could provide experimental evidence for dark matter. Particle laboratories equipped with B-meson factories such as Belle and BaBar are extremely sensitive to B-meson decays involving missing energy and currently have the capability to detect the  channel. The LHC is also capable of searching for this interaction since it produces several orders of magnitude more B-mesons than Belle or BaBar, but there are more challenges from the decreased control over B-meson initial energy in the accelerator.

See also 
 Affleck–Dine mechanism
 Anthropic principle
 Big Bang
 Chronology of the universe
 CP violation
 Leptogenesis (physics)
 Lepton

References

Articles

Textbooks

Preprints 
 
 
 

Physical cosmology
Particle physics
Baryons
Unsolved problems in physics
Big Bang
Concepts in astronomy
Antimatter